St. Benedict is an unincorporated community in Helena Township, Scott County, Minnesota, United States.  The community is located along 250th Street West at St. Benedict Road near New Prague.

The West Branch of Raven Stream and the East Branch of Raven Stream meet at St. Benedict.

References

Unincorporated communities in Minnesota
Unincorporated communities in Scott County, Minnesota